Ernest Christopher, Count of Rietberg (1 April 1606 – 31 December 1640) was a member of the house of Cirksena and was Count of Rietberg from 1625 to 1640.

Life 
Ernst Christoph was the fourth of the eleven children of John III and his wife, Sabina Catherine.  Since his elder brother Edzard had died young, he was heir apparent of Rietberg from the day he was born.

Shortly before his father's death, Ernest Christopher promised to build a Franciscan monastery in Rietberg.  His father died in 1625 and Ernest Christopher took up government.  On 10 November 1626, he married Albertine Maria Marquise de St. Martin; this marriage remained childless.  On 6 January 1629, he founded a Franciscan monastery, as he had promised.  The church of the new monastery was consecrated later that year.  His parents were reburied in the crypt under the monastery church.

In 1631, Ernest Christopher was appointed colonel of the Cavalry.  He was later promoted to Vice-marshall and on 8 March 1634, he was promoted to imperial major general.

He died on 31 December 1640 and was buried in the crypt of the Franciscan church.  His widow married with Charles de la Baume.

In 1645, his brother Francis Ferdinand began a court case before the Reichskammergericht.  He wanted to reverse some donations Ernest had made to his wife during his lifetime.

External links 
 Biography

Counts of Rietberg
House of Cirksena
1606 births
1640 deaths
17th-century German military personnel
Generals of the Holy Roman Empire
Military personnel of the Thirty Years' War